Ben Coker (born 17 June 1989) is an English professional footballer who plays as a defender or as a midfielder for National League club Solihull Moors.

Career
In 2007, Coker spent time with sixth-tier Swedish club Ånge IF, scoring two goals.

Coker joined Bury Town in October 2008 from fellow Southern League side Barton Rovers. He was previously with Conference side Histon. He impressed on his debut for Bury, earning the sponsors man of the match award. Coker helped the Suffolk club win promotion to the Isthmian League.

Colchester United
In summer 2010, Coker joined Colchester United after he impressed in a trial period at the end of 2009–10 season, having done well for non-league Bury Town during the 2009–10 campaign. On 30 September 2010, Coker joined Chelmsford City on loan for a month. The loan was extended by a further month and was given permission to play in an FA Cup tie against Hendon.

On 14 January 2011, Coker made his debut for Colchester against Bournemouth in a 2–1 victory, providing assists for both goals. He was awarded the Colchester United Young Player of the Year award at the end of the 2010–11 season, his first with the club. On 15 May 2012, Coker signed a 12-month contract extension to see him through to summer 2013 with Colchester. On 12 October 2012, Coker was loaned to former club Histon on a month-long deal.

On 4 February 2013, Coker had his contract with Colchester cancelled by mutual consent having made only two first-team appearances in the 2012–13 season.

He returned to Histon permanently on 8 February 2013 following a loan spell earlier in the same season.

Southend United
Prior to the 2013–14 season, he played in three friendlies for Southend United, impressing  sufficiently in the games he played to be offered a contract by manager Phil Brown. On 16 April 2014, Coker signed a new two-year deal at Southend United, keeping him contracted until June 2016, and on 7 August 2015 this was extended for another 3 years with an option for a further year.

On 27 October 2018 he suffered a serious knee injury whilst playing for Southend against Sunderland, and did not play any more games that season. His struggle to recover from the injury was the subject of a BBC documentary series entitled 'Coming Back',. He never played any more games for Southend, and was released by them at the end of the 2018–19 season.

Lincoln City
On 23 August 2019 it was announced that he had signed for Lincoln City. He only played one cup game before being loaned to Cambridge United in January 2020.

Coker signed a season-long loan at League Two club Stevenage on 7 August 2020.

Stevenage
On 16 October 2020, he made his season-long loan permanent at Stevenage. Coker was released at the endd of the 2021–22 season.

Solihull Moors
On 4 August 2022, Coker signed for National League club Solihull Moors on a one-year deal.

Personal life
Coker developed type 1 diabetes at the age of 15.

Career statistics

Honours
Southend United
Football League Two play-offs: 2015

Individual
PFA Team of the Year: 2014–15 League Two

References

External links

1989 births
Living people
English footballers
Association football midfielders
Bury Town F.C. players
Colchester United F.C. players
Barton Rovers F.C. players
Chelmsford City F.C. players
Histon F.C. players
Southend United F.C. players
Lincoln City F.C. players
Cambridge United F.C. players
Stevenage F.C. players
Solihull Moors F.C. players
Southern Football League players
English Football League players
People with type 1 diabetes
English expatriate footballers
English expatriate sportspeople in Sweden